Gefen (lit. Grapevine) is a moshav in central Israel. Located between Beit Shemesh and Kiryat Malakhi, it falls under the jurisdiction of Mateh Yehuda Regional Council.

History
The village was established in 1955 by Jewish immigrants from Morocco on land that had belonged to the depopulated Palestinian Arab village of Mughallis, and was is named after Psalm 80:15: "God Almighty, look down from heaven and see; watch over this grapevine."

References

Moshavim
Populated places established in 1955
Populated places in Jerusalem District
1955 establishments in Israel
Moroccan-Jewish culture in Israel